The Porsche 997 is the internal designation for the Porsche 911 sports car manufactured and sold by the German automobile manufacturer Porsche between 2004 (as Model Year 2005) and 2013. Production of the Carrera and Carrera S coupés began in early 2004, all-wheel drive Carrera 4 and Carrera 4S began to be delivered to customers in November 2005, the Turbo and GT3 derivatives went on sale in late 2006 and the GT2 in 2007. In addition to the coupé and cabriolet versions, Targa versions of the Carrera 4 and Carrera 4S were also available, which carry on with the "glass canopy" roof design used since its first application on the 993 until the 991, which reverted to the classic targa top layout used on the early 911 Targas.

The 997 was an evolution of the preceding 996, with the most significant changes being interior and exterior styling, the most notable being the replacement of the "fried egg" headlamps used on the 996 with the classic "bug eye" units. Larger 18-inch wheels were fitted as standard, and other engineering changes include slightly increased power; however, the car is technically very similar to its predecessor albeit with many revisions. A new S version was offered, with additional power from a slightly larger engine, sports suspension, and sports exhaust.

During 2009, Porsche updated the 997 line-up including styling changes, a revised engine with direct injection and the introduction of the company's new "PDK" dual clutch transmission. As a result, the updated 997 models were faster, lighter and more fuel efficient than the outgoing versions, with improved handling.

The 997 received mostly positive reviews from the worldwide motoring press; even British motoring journalist Jeremy Clarkson, a known detractor of Porsche cars, noted that the 997 will "make love to your fingertips and stir your soul."

First phase (2004–2008)

History and development

By February 1999, just a few months into the 997 development programme that began in the fourth quarter of 1998, designers were already at work on the 997 body design. After numerous reviews during the rest of 1999 and full size clay models built from 2000 into 2001, a final design by designer Grant Larson was approved. Early prototypes were built in late 2001 for testing, based on the newly set parameters. While the exterior styling was revised, it was again more evolution rather than revolution; typical of Porsche. The rear bodywork was a total of  wider than its predecessor. However, the most notable aesthetic difference between the 997 and the 996 was the return to oval headlights like those of pre-996 Carreras, with separate indicator units. The interior was re-designed with new controls; however, it was more reminiscent of classic 911 interiors than of the outgoing 996. The body in general remained low profile with a drag coefficient of 0.28 for the Carrera and 0.29 for the Carrera S.

Cabriolet

For the first time, development of the cabriolet version of the 997 led the design and engineering effort at Porsche with the coupé following. Porsche applied the logic that if you started with the more difficult cabriolet challenges (for chassis stiffness) the coupé version would simply be more rigid. Despite additional weight, the cabriolet versions attain nearly the same performance figures as their coupé counterparts. Even the rear tail comes up slightly higher on the cabriolets to compensate for differences in drag over the canvas top vs. the smoother coupé shape. The 997 cabriolet had factory optional hard tops that provided better protection from unexpected weather conditions than the conventional canvas top. It is interchangeable with that available on the late 996 cabriolet models. The hardtop provides a winter option to cabriolet owners.

911 Club Coupé (2005)
The 911 Club Coupé is a limited (50 units) version of the 2006 Carrera S coupé with X51 Powerkit commemorating the 50th anniversary of the Porsche Club of America (PCA).

The vehicle included an Azurro California-colour scheme (similar to the colour found on the Porsche 356), a vehicle identification number (VIN) which ended with the production number and special commemorative badging and door sills, Sport Chrono Package Plus system, and optional Porsche Ceramic Composite Brakes.

The car bearing chassis number #001 was transferred to the Porsche Museum in Stuttgart, Germany. One PCA member won the car bearing chassis number #050 in a sweepstakes drawing. The remaining 48 units were sold to randomly chosen U.S. and Canadian PCA members. After 2005-08-15, unsold units were made available to the general public.

The vehicle was unveiled in PCA's 50th Annual Porsche Parade in Hershey, Pa.

The vehicle had an MSRP of US$99,911 or $145,911 CDN.

Targa

The Targa 4 and 4S versions were introduced in 2006. Like its predecessors, the 993 and 996, the 997 Targa is equipped with a glass roof system. At any speed, the roof can be opened where it drops down 25 mm and slides a metre back underneath the rear window. As the roof weighs an additional , the suspension has been modified as compared to the other Carrera models. When the glass roof is retracted, a small glass deflector is raised above the windshield to aid aerodynamic stability.

Unlike previous versions, the 997 Targa was only available with all-wheel drive. Targa 4 models are slightly slower than the hard top Carrera models because of the heavier roof and the all-wheel-drive system.

The 997 Targa became available in the fall of 2006 as a 2007 Model. In the first year, Porsche produced 1,760 cars worldwide (with 800 sold in the US market) out of the 38,922 911 models produced in total.

Carrera S and 4S

The new all-wheel-drive Coupé, Cabriolet, and Targa versions were later available either in the S version alongside the Carrera with the following additional features:

increased displacement of the engine (3.8 L vs 3.6 L) with increased power
lowered suspension with PASM (Porsche Active Suspension Management, i.e. adjustable dampers)
19-inch wheels
upgraded braking system
sports exhaust
Bi-Xenon headlights
aluminium trim in the interior

Turbo

The 997 Turbo debuted in February 2006 at the Geneva Motor Show. It featured a new front bumper with LED turn signal strips integrated in the air intakes; the fog lamps were moved to the corners of the bumpers. Large air vents fore and aft of the rear wheels provide other obvious visual cues of the Turbo model. The turbo utilises the wide body shell of the AWD models, giving it a more aggressive stance than the base 911 models. Also featured was a retractable rear wing, as used on the 996 Turbo along with air vents on the rear quarter panels in order for effective engine cooling. The 997 Turbo is  lighter than its predecessor due to the extensive use of aluminium in key elements of the car.

The torque is managed by Porsche Traction Management (PTM) system in conjunction with the Porsche Stability Management (PSM) system in order for a safer utilisation of the torque produced by the engine.

The engine uses two BorgWarner VTG turbochargers, a first for a Porsche production car. The turbochargers are fitted with a two-stage resonance intake system. The Variable Turbine Geometry incorporates guide vanes on the turbine wheel that change their angle of attack with exhaust speed, reducing turbo lag at low speeds while opening up to prevent excessive back pressure at high RPM.

The optional Sport Chrono package allows the 911 Turbo to overboost for ten seconds (1.0 bar to 1.2 bar), increasing peak torque over a narrow RPM range.

According to official Porsche figures, the 997 Turbo accelerates from a standstill  in 3.9 seconds with the manual transmission, and 3.7 seconds with the 5-speed Tiptronic S transmission.

As an option, Porsche also offered its ceramic brake system, PCCB (Porsche Ceramic Composite Brake). The advantages of this high-tech material mean a reduction of  compared to the standard brake system, excellent fade resistance owing to consistent friction values, and absolute corrosion resistance. The brakes were 380 mm diameter at the front and 350 mm at the rear.

Turbo Cabriolet

Porsche AG announced on 7 May 2007 that the 911 Turbo Cabriolet would go on sale in September 2007. The Porsche 997 Turbo Cabriolet became one of the fastest convertible sports cars in production. It is capable of similar top speeds and acceleration to the standard Porsche 997 turbo coupé, a notable feat due to the typical problems associated with convertible variants of hardtop coupés, such as the poor aerodynamics of a soft top, a lack of torsional rigidity, and the consequential weight increase from structural members.

GT2

The 996 GT2 was superseded by the 997 GT2, which went on sale in November 2007. At its release, the 997-generation Porsche 911 GT2 was the most powerful and fastest road-going 911 ever to have been sold to the public.

Unlike the 997 Turbo, the 997 GT2 uses a rear wheel drive layout for reduced weight (primarily for competing in GT2 class racing as with its predecessors), and boasts a power increase from a newly designed expansion intake manifold, and shorter turbo intake manifolds. Further, a full titanium exhaust system was fitted to the 997 GT2 contributing to reduced weight as compared to the turbo. Despite the power hike, Porsche claims fuel consumption at full throttle is improved by 15 percent compared with the 997 Turbo. This makes it the first 911 to exceed the  top speed barrier after the 1998 Porsche 911 GT1 Race Version (which is not considered to be an actual Porsche 911 due to its mid-mounted engine and overall shape). The only transmission available is a 6-speed manual.

The GT2 was the first Porsche equipped with launch control.

The appearance of the GT2 is slightly different from its sister-car, the 997 Turbo, in a few ways. It does away with fog lights in the front bumper and has integrated turn signals in the front air intakes, has a revised front lip, has a larger rear wing (with two small air scoops on either side), and has a different rear bumper (now featuring titanium exhaust pipes).

GT3

The GT3 variant debuted at the 2006 Geneva Motor Show alongside the 997 Turbo. Like previous GT3 models, it is a way for Porsche to homologate aerodynamic features for racing, as well as to offer race cars for customer teams. The 997 GT3 was priced at US$106,000. The engine has the same displacement as the Turbo, but does away with the turbochargers and uses a new variable intake system. It has an 8,400 rpm redline matching that of the Carrera GT flagship. The 3.6 L dry-sump engine does not suffer from the rear main seal problems of the earlier 3.6 L/3.8 L integrated dry-sump engines.

The GT3's body work includes a special front bumper which increases cooling for the front-mounted radiators as well as a split spoiler at the rear. The GT3 also includes a special rear bumper and center tailpipes which draw heat away from the engine. The suspension system is lowered and the car utilises 30-series  tyres and  wheels. The car weighs .

The 997 GT3 is more driver-friendly than its predecessor, with "comfort" seats and the Porsche Communication Management system installed.

The special GT3 RS model came without many of the luxuries typically found in a Carrera to focus more on track-orientated driving (although the car is still road-legal). The RS trim was also available with a full roll cage and carbon fibre seats along with a large fixed rear wing to add to the race-car-for-the-road feel. The RS trim was introduced in Europe in October 2006; the North American release was in March 2007. A racing version of the GT3 RS debuted in 2007, called the 997 GT3 RSR.

The ratios on the six-speed transmission are closer, allowing the GT3 to reach  in 4.1 seconds, while the RS accomplishes the same in exactly 4 seconds.

Engines

"*" Models with turbocharged engines include Variable Turbine Geometry (VTG) turbochargers.

General performance
The base Carrera has essentially the same  flat-6 (Boxer) engine from 996 Carrera. The Carrera S however uses a new  flat-6 engine. The X51 Powerkit is available for S, 4S, Targa models, which increases engine power.

The viscous clutch all wheel drive system sends between 5% and 40% of engine torque to the front wheels as per need.

The test is conducted by the magazine Teknikens Värld's in Sweden, as a test of avoiding a moose in the road.

Second phase (2009–2013)

The 997 received a mid-cycle refresh in 2008 for the 2009 model year. The updated model range was unveiled at the Paris Auto Show in September 2008. The updated Porsche 911 (called 997 Gen II internally at Porsche and 997.2 informally by enthusiasts) included the following changes:

New engine with direct fuel injection. The engine is mounted  lower in the tail section
Revised suspension system
Revised front bumper with larger air intakes
Headlamps with LED daytime running lights and newly optional dual HID projectors
Revised rear bumper with a new LED tail light design; AWD models included a reflective stripe between the tail lights
Enlarged exterior mirrors
Redesigned Porsche Sports Exhaust (PSE)
Redesigned PCM system with touch-screen and optional hard-drive navigation and Bluetooth.
New Porsche Doppelkupplungsgetriebe (PDK) transmission replacing the optional Tiptronic S.

Production of the 997 Gen II model began in late 2008. Initially available models included coupé and cabriolet versions of the Carrera, Carrera 4, Carrera S and Carrera 4S. Pricing was increased from the 997 Gen I; the base Carrera model was set to start at US$76,300 for North American buyers.

On 6 June 2008, these changes to the Porsche 911 were revealed on the Porsche website. The Turbo was not revealed until the Frankfurt Motor Show in September, thereafter the Turbo-based GT2 received the updated changes.

Models

Notes:
MSRP prices are set to the United States. In Europe, prices are considerably higher and in some countries can even be double the price quoted for North American markets, mainly due to higher local tax rates.
Integrated dry sump in all but GT3, GT3 RS, GT2 RS variants which have a dry sump with external oil reservoir and 7 pumps instead of only 3 in the less powerful versions.
Integrated dry sump is Porsche's name for a dry sump lubrication system integrated within the engine block, i.e. no separate oil reservoir.

Targa (2009–2012)

The updated Targa 4 and Targa 4S models were announced on 28 July 2008. The Targa now had a glass roof made of a special glass that repelled UV rays from entering the car.

Turbo/Turbo Cabriolet (2010–2013)

The refreshed version of the 997 Turbo was unveiled at the 2009 Frankfurt Motor Show. The new engine shared the construction of other 997 Gen II DFI engines. The 997 Gen I engine's Nikasil cylinder liners were replaced with an Alusil block that combined the cylinders and crankcase into an integrated casting for each bank, thus reducing weight (in contrast to a separate cylinder block and crankcase for each bank). The dry sump lubrication system in the Turbo is different from other 911 models in that it uses integrated oil reservoirs at the bottom of the engine, separate from the crank case and utilises six oil pumps. The engine is configured with direct fuel injection and a compression ratio of 9.8:1. The intake manifold is a slightly larger unit, adopted from the outgoing GT2 along with slightly larger intake valves, wheels for the Turbochargers, and intercoolers. The exhaust system is also more refined and aids in the power increase while improving fuel economy. The overall result is an engine that is  lighter than the previous engine and has a peak turbo-boost of 11.6 psi (a decrease from the outgoing model).

The suspension system was also revised and had new software to enhance handling. The BorgWarner all-wheel-drive system received new software for more linear delivery of power to the front wheels.

The Turbo was available with a manual transmission or the optional 7-speed PDK dual-clutch gearbox, which replaced the Tiptronic.
The model was also available with optional Porsche Torque Vectoring (PTV), which brakes the inner rear wheel to provide turning-torque through a curve reducing initial under steer. The look of the refreshed Gen II model was left mostly untouched from the 997 turbo Gen I. The taillights were updated to LED to match the 997 Gen II along with changes to the front lamps. The exhaust pipes were "fatter", and the standard 19 in wheels received a new design. Thanks to revised dynamics the facelifted 997 can handle 1.3 g forces on a skid-pad according to Porsche.

Models equipped with the PDK also include an optional 3-spoke steering wheel with gearshift paddles as an alternative to the standard steering wheel with shift buttons.

Production versions went on sale in Germany in November 2009. European models had an MSRP of €122,400 for the Coupé and €131,800 for the Cabriolet (before tax).

Turbo S (2010–2013)

A more powerful version of the Turbo called the Turbo S (S standing for Sport) was unveiled at the Geneva Motor Show in March 2010. European deliveries were scheduled for May 2010 with production ending in early 2013. The engine had revised intake valve timing and a new carbon fibre airbox installed to achieve this feat. The Turbo S also gained carbon-ceramic brakes and the Sport Chrono package as standard features. Maximum torque was available between 2,100 rpm and 4,250 rpm. The 911 Turbo S, by contrast to the regular Turbo, was configured to operate with a higher boost pressure level, which meant that maximum torque was available for an unlimited period.

GT3 (2010–2012)

The updated Porsche 911 GT3 was unveiled at the 2009 Geneva Motor Show, and became available in Europe starting in May, and in the US starting in October. The car now featured vents between the tail lights, a larger rear wing with "3.8" lettering on either side of the wing to denote the increase in engine displacement, forged pistons, lightweight valves and hollow camshafts in order to make the engine light weight, a special 6-speed manual transmission was the only transmission option with shorter gear ratios in order to feed optimum power to the rear wheels. Total downforce was doubled, and for the first time stability control was offered to help less experienced drivers. The sport mode when activated, delivers an additional  of torque to the rear wheels.

Equipment
The GT3 and GT3 RS were developed by Porsche's Motorsport Division in Weissach. Sales began in September 2009 for all regions except China. Features included titanium double exhaust pipes, carbon fibre rear spoiler lip (Gurney flap) and rear lid ram air scoop, carbon fibre front above bumper air outlet and rear-view mirrors, aluminium 19in forged alloy wheels made specifically for the car with central locking nuts. The GT3 was available with Michelin Pilot Sport Cup tyres having a size of 235/35-19 at the front and 305/30-19 at the rear. A roll cage and a fire extinguisher was optional in the UK.

GT3 RS (2010–2012)

The GT3 RS is a high performance version of the GT3 with a higher engine power output, lower weight and shorter transmission ratios, as well as having upgraded body and suspension components, designed for homologating the race version of the 911 GT3. The "RS" stands for "rennsport", the German word for "racing" (literally, "race sport").

The transmission has shorter ratios than found in the 911 GT3 for improved acceleration. Dynamic engine mounts are standard and serve to improve the car's handling to an even higher level. Other features include PASM suspension, titanium connecting rods, a wider front and rear track, a large fixed rear wing made from carbon fibre, a standard roll cage, and corresponding decals.

Optional equipment included a lithium-ion battery, which is  lighter than the stock lead-acid battery. The vehicle was unveiled at the 2009 Frankfurt Motor Show. The US model was set to go on sale in early spring of 2010 with an MSRP of US$132,800.

GT3 Cup (2009)

Unveiled at the 2009 Frankfurt Motor Show, the GT3 Cup is a Porsche Carrera Cup race car based on the 911 GT3 RS. It includes a  wider rear body,  lower front spoiler,  rear wing (from the 911 GT3 Cup S race car), LED taillights, a racing exhaust system with a fully controlled catalytic converter (from Porsche Mobil1 Supercup cars), Porsche Ceramic Composite Brakes. 9.5Jx18 front alloy wheels with 24/64-18 Michelin racing tyres and 12Jx18 alloy wheels with 27/68-18 tyres, additional Unibal joints on the track control arms and front and rear sword-shaped anti-roll bars with seven position settings each, an additional vent in the upper part of the front lid, steering wheel mounted Info Display with 6 switches.

Production model began delivery in 2009–2010. European model had a base MSRP of €149,850 (before tax).

911 Sport Classic (2010–2011)

Unveiled at the 2009 Frankfurt Auto show, the Sport Classic is a limited (250 units- all sold in under 48 hours) version of the 911 Carrera S coupé, inspired by the 1973 Carrera RS 2.7. It includes a 6-speed manual transmission, double-dome roof (informally called double bubble roof),  wider rear fenders, SportDesign front apron with a front spoiler and a fixed 'duck tail' rear wing (similar to the one found on the Carrera RS 2.7), Porsche Ceramic Composite Braking system (PCCB),  lower PASM sports suspension, mechanical rear axle differential, 19-inch black Fuchs wheels, Porsche Exclusive woven leather seats and door panels, dashboard with Espresso Nature natural leather upholstery, and a specially developed Sport Classic Grey body colour.

Sales began in January 2010. European models had base MSRP of €169,300 (before tax).

911 GT2 RS (2010)

On 4 May 2010, the GT2 RS was publicly unveiled to the German Porsche dealers in Leipzig. It was the fastest and the most powerful 911 built of its generation.

According to Porsche Motorsports manager Andreas Preuninger, the RS was conceived around 2007 as a skunk-works effort. The 727 code number selected for the project corresponds to one of the Nissan GT-R's lap times around the Nürburgring's Nordschleife. When the dust settled, Porsche claimed that test driver Timo Kluck had supposedly eclipsed that target by nine seconds.

The GT2 has since then been an RS model only with no standard (non-RS) variant available.

911 Carrera GTS and Carrera 4 GTS (2010–2011)

In 2011, Porsche launched a new, mid-level 911 coming in above the Carrera and below the GT3. Ranging from $103,100 to US$112,900, the Carrera GTS was available as both a coupé and cabriolet, the car gets a wider body and track – the only Carrera variant with a wide track that is also rear wheel drive. The Carrera 4 GTS equipped with all-wheel-drive was unveiled in May 2011. In addition to the AWD system, the Carrera 4 GTS can be identified by a distinct reflective stripe between the tail lights. All GTS vehicles came standard with center lock wheels, Alcantara interior and other optional extras such as Porsche Sports Exhaust and PASM.

911 Speedster (2011)

In 2011, Porsche introduced a new 911 Speedster variant having a production run of 356 units only, the production number coming from the iconic car of the 1950s. It was the third production 911 Speedster made, preceded by the 930 and 964 generations (the 993 generation didn't have a regular production speedster variant and the 996 generation didn't have a speedster variant at all). Only two colours were offered, Pure Blue (which was developed specifically for the Speedster) and Carrara White. (Paint To Sample versions were produced in very limited numbers).

The Speedster featured a windscreen  shorter than the standard 997 cabriolet while maintaining the same rake angle along with a familiar hump on the rear section to store the soft top.

GT3 RS 4.0 (2011)

In April 2011 Porsche revealed the final evolution of the 997, the 911 GT3 RS 4.0. It featured a 4.0-litre engine utilizing the crankshaft from the GT3 RSR with increased stroke dimensions (from 76.4 mm to 80.4 mm). Chassis development was influenced by the GT2 RS and uses parts sourced from other RS 911 models. Front dive planes provided additional downforce up front. Production was limited to only 600 cars.

Transmissions
All models include standard 6-speed manual transmission except for the Turbo S models and Speedster. The 7-speed PDK transmission was available in all but GT3, GT3 RS, GT3 Cup, GT3 RS 4.0, GT2, GT2 RS, and Sport Classic models. The PDK transmission features a Sport Plus setting that includes launch control and faster shifts.

Performance

Physical

*PDK +, Cabriolet +, Lithium-ion battery

Marketing
In June 2009, Porsche Cars North America partnered with five New York City street artists to unveil five graffiti-decorated Porsche 911 hoods in the Helenbeck Gallery. The hoods were sold to raise funds for CITYarts, a New York City-based organization whose mission is to bring children in contact with public artists.

References

Further reading

External links

Official Porsche website
Porsche 911 Carrera updates for 2009 Motor Trend
Porsche 911 997 GT2 Exterior and Interior in Full HD 3D YouTube

997
Sports cars
Coupés
Convertibles
Cars powered by boxer engines
Rear-wheel-drive vehicles
All-wheel-drive vehicles
2010s cars
Cars introduced in 2004
Rear-engined vehicles